Tetranthus is a genus of flowering plants in the tribe Heliantheae within the family Asteraceae.

 Species
 Tetranthus bahamensis Britt. – Bahamas 
 Tetranthus cupulatus Urb. – Hispaniola 
 Tetranthus hirsutus Spreng. – Hispaniola 
 Tetranthus littoralis Sw. – Hispaniola

 formerly included
see Pinillosia 
 Tetranthus berteroi – Pinillosia berteroi

References

Heliantheae
Asteraceae genera
Flora of the Caribbean
Taxa named by Olof Swartz